Batashyurt (Bataş-yurt) is a rural locality (a selo) in Khasavyurtovsky District, Republic of Dagestan, Russia. The population was 3,298 as of 2010. There are 47 streets.

Geography 
Batashyurt is located 11 km northwest of Khasavyurt (the district's administrative centre) by road. Osmanyurt is the nearest rural locality.

References 

Rural localities in Khasavyurtovsky District